Water polo in the United States is governed by different organizations. The USA Water Polo (USAWP) governs most levels of water polo in the country, including the national teams and amateur tournaments. The National Collegiate Athletic Association (NCAA) governs colleges, and the National Federation of State High School Associations (NFHS) governs high schools. No professional water polo leagues run in the United States.

National water polo teams
The United States men's and women's national water polo teams represent the United States in international tournaments, including the Olympic Games, World Aquatics Championships, FINA Water Polo World Cup, FINA Water Polo World League, and Pan American Games.

Men's national team

The United States men's national water polo team has won multiple medals in international tournaments. In 1988 and 2009, the United States rose to World No. 2 in the FINA Water Polo World Rankings, their highest ranking to date.

Olympic Games

Men's water polo tournaments have been staged at the Olympic Games since 1900. The United States has participated in 22 of 27 tournaments.

The United States men's national water polo team is the only non-European squad to win medals in the men's Olympic water polo tournament. At the 1904 Olympic Games, The U.S. squad won the gold, silver and bronze medals in the men's water polo tournament (demonstration event). Since 1904 the team has won three silver medals at the 1984, 1988, and 2008 Olympic Games, and three bronze medals at the 1924, 1932, and 1972 Olympic Games. The team also finished fourth at the 1920, 1952 and 1992 Olympic Games.

Other international tournaments
Men's water polo tournaments have been staged at the FINA World Aquatics Championships since 1973. The United States has participated in every tournament, but the team has not won any medals. The best finish is fourth place (1986, 1991 and 2009). (Note: European squads have won all medals in the men's water polo tournaments.)

The FINA Men's Water Polo World Cup was established in 1979. The United States has participated in 15 of 16 tournaments. The team has won the 1991 and 1997 FINA Men's Water Polo World Cup, becoming the only non-European squad to win the FINA Men's Water Polo World Cup. The team also finished as runners-up in 1979 and 1985. In addition, the team finished in fourth place 7 times (1981, 1983, 1987, 1993, 1995, 2010 and 2014).

The FINA Men's Water Polo World League began in 2002. The United States has participated in 17 of 18 tournaments. The team finished in second place twice (2008 and 2016), third place once (2003), and fourth place 7 times (2007, 2009, 2011, 2012, 2013, 2015 and 2017).

Men's water polo tournaments have been staged at the Pan American Games since 1951. The United States team has participated and medaled in all eighteen tournaments. Since 1995, the team has won seven gold medals in a row (1995, 1999, 2003, 2007, 2011, 2015 and 2019).

Competitive record
Updated after the 2019 Pan American Games.

Women's national team

The United States fielded a women's national water polo team in the 1970s. Two decades later, the women's team became one of the leading teams in the world. Since 2014, the team has consecutively been ranked as World No. 1 team in the FINA Water Polo World Rankings.

Olympic Games
A women's water polo tournament was introduced for the 2000 Olympic Games. Since then, the United States has participated in every tournament.

The United States women's national water polo team is the only team to have medaled in all five Olympic tournaments, and the only team to have won two gold medals (2012, 2016). In addition, the team has won two silver medals at the 2000 and 2008 Olympic Games.

Other international tournaments
Women's water polo tournaments have been staged at the FINA World Aquatics Championships since 1986. The United States has participated in every tournament, and captured six world championship titles (2003, 2007, 2009, 2015, 2017, and 2019). The team also finished as runners-up in 2005.

The FINA Women's Water Polo World Cup was established in 1979. The United States has participated in every tournament. The team has won the 1979, 2010, 2014 and 2018 FINA Women's Water Polo World Cup. In addition, the team finished in second place 5 times (1980, 1983, 1984, 1989 and 2002).

The FINA Women's Water Polo World League began in 2004. The United States has participated in every tournament. The team has finished in first place 13 times. As of today, there are only three tournaments in which the United States participated but did not receive a gold medal.

Women's water polo tournaments have been staged at the Pan American Games since 1999. The United States team has participated and medaled in all six tournaments. Since 2003, the team has won five gold medals in a row (2003, 2007, 2011, 2015 and 2019).

Competitive record
Updated after the 2019 Pan American Games.

College water polo
Water polo does not have a professional tournament in the United States, so the highest level of annual competition is at the college level. As a varsity sport for both men and women, the NCAA sanctions water polo is popular in the United States along the west coast, and parts of the east coast.

Men's college water polo
In the 2017–18 school year, 48 NCAA member schools sponsored men's water polo at the varsity level, with 1,047 participants across all three divisions.

NCAA Men's Water Polo Championship

The NCAA Men's Water Polo Championship is an annual tournament to determine the national champion of NCAA men's collegiate water polo. It has been held every year since 1969. All men's teams, whether from Division I, Division II, or Division III, are eligible to compete each year.

Women's college water polo
In the 2017–18 school year, 62 NCAA member schools sponsored women's water polo at the varsity level, with 1,216 participants across all three divisions.

NCAA Women's Water Polo Championship

The NCAA Women's Water Polo Championship is an annual tournament to determine the national champion of NCAA women's collegiate water polo. It has been held every year since 2001. All women's teams, whether from Division I, Division II, or Division III, are eligible to compete each year.

High school water polo
High school water polo is popular in some states, including California, Florida and Illinois.

Boys' high school water polo
The National Federation of State High School Associations featured 22,475 boys in water polo teams in the 2018–19 school year.

*Abbreviations: CA – California, DC – Washington, D.C., FL – Florida, HI – Hawaii, IL – Illinois, ME – Maine, MI – Michigan, MO – Missouri, NE – Nebraska, NV – Nevada, OH – Ohio, PA – Pennsylvania, TX – Texas, UT – Utah.

Girls' high school water polo
The National Federation of State High School Associations featured 21,735 girls in water polo teams in the 2018–19 school year.

#Abbreviations: CA – California, FL – Florida, HI – Hawaii, IL – Illinois, ME – Maine, MI – Michigan, MO – Missouri, NV – Nevada, OH – Ohio, PA – Pennsylvania, TX – Texas, UT – Utah.

USA Water Polo Hall of Fame

The USA Water Polo Hall of Fame was established by the USA Water Polo in 1976 to honor players, coaches and officials who have contributed greatly to water polo in the United States.

See also
 USA Water Polo
 United States men's national water polo team
 United States women's national water polo team
 NCAA Men's Water Polo Championship
 NCAA Women's Water Polo Championship
 USA Water Polo Hall of Fame

Notes

References

External links
 National Governing Body
 USA Water Polo

 Collegiate
 National Collegiate Athletic Association (NCAA) Men's Water Polo
 National Collegiate Athletic Association (NCAA) Women's Water Polo

 High School
 National Federation of State High School Associations (NFHS) Water Polo